Apgar is a surname. Notable people with the surname include:

Charles E. Apgar, New Jersey amateur radio operator
Kristina Apgar (born 1985), American television actress
Mahlon Apgar IV, expert on housing, infrastructure, and real estate
Virginia Apgar (1909-1974), American physician, developer of the Apgar score

See also
Apgar (disambiguation)